Toledo is a city in, and the county seat of, Tama County, Iowa, United States. The population was 2,369 at the time of the 2020 census.

History
 Toledo was founded in 1853 as the county seat of Tama County. It was named after Toledo, Ohio. Toledo was incorporated as a city in 1866.

Geography
Toledo is located at  (41.993281, -92.579067).

Climate

According to the Köppen Climate Classification system, Toledo has a hot-summer humid continental climate, abbreviated "Dfa" on climate maps.

Demographics

2010 census
As of the census of 2010, there were 2,341 people, 901 households, and 598 families living in the city. The racial makeup of the city was 83.5% White, 1.1% African American, 5.8% Native American, 0.6% Asian, 4.3% from other races, and 4.8% from two or more races. Hispanic or Latino of any race were 11.4% of the population.

There were 901 households, of which 31.5% had children under the age of 18 living with them, 51.4% were married couples living together, 10.5% had a female householder with no husband present, 4.4% had a male householder with no wife present, and 33.6% were non-families. 28.3% of all households were made up of individuals, and 13.3% had someone living alone who was 65 years of age or older. The average household size was 2.43 and the average family size was 2.94.

The median age in the city was 40.3 years. 27.5% of residents were under the age of 18; 6.9% were between the ages of 18 and 24; 21.4% were from 25 to 44; 25.8% were from 45 to 64; and 18.3% were 65 years of age or older. The gender makeup of the city was 46.3% male and 53.7% female.

2000 census
As of the census of 2000, there were 2,539 people, 982 households, and 632 families living in the city. The racial makeup of the city was 87.51% White, 0.51% African American, 5.83% Native American, 0.35% Asian, 0.04% Pacific Islander, 2.91% from other races, and 2.84% from two or more races. Hispanic or Latino of any race were 5.87% of the population.

There were 982 households, out of which 30.0% had children under the age of 18 living with them, 49.1% were married couples living together, 12.6% had a female householder with no husband present, and 35.6% were non-families. 30.8% of all households were made up of individuals, and 16.6% had someone living alone who was 65 years of age or older. The average household size was 2.36 and the average family size was 2.93.

Age spread: 27.4% under the age of 18, 8.7% from 18 to 24, 24.4% from 25 to 44, 20.1% from 45 to 64, and 19.4% who were 65 years of age or older. The median age was 38 years. For every 100 females, there were 84.8 males. For every 100 females age 18 and over, there were 81.9 males.

The median income for a household in the city was $33,750, and the median income for a family was $40,833. Males had a median income of $30,273 versus $22,349 for females. The per capita income for the city was $16,293. About 8.5% of families and 11.0% of the population were below the poverty line, including 17.9% of those under age 18 and 7.0% of those age 65 or over.

Government and infrastructure
The Iowa Department of Human Services operated the Iowa Juvenile Home in Toledo.

Notable people

Leander Clark, Iowa politician
King Cole, baseball pitcher, gave up Babe Ruth's first hit
W. K. Davidson (1904-1974), Illinois businessman and state legislator
Michael Emerson, actor
Norma 'Duffy' Lyon (1929–2011) sculptor nicknamed the "Butter Cow Lady"
George R. Struble, Iowa judge and politician; speaker of the Iowa House of Representatives, 1881–1883
John T. Struble, pioneering businessman
Isaac S. Struble, U.S. Representative

Education

Toledo is within the South Tama County Community School District. The district includes a class 3A high school that enrolls over 430 students, a middle school, and an elementary school that has over 700 students.

Parks and Recreation
Toledo Heights sits on the west side of town. The park has two fields which are used for little-league baseball and softball. The park has a playground and a large picnic shelter. Surrounding the park is an 18-hole disc golf course.

Each summer, the annual Stoplight Festival takes place on the town square. The celebration surrounds the historic stoplight located at the intersection of High Street and Broadway.

Arts
The Wieting Theatre is located in downtown Toledo, one block east of the stoplight and the Tama County Courthouse square, at 101 South Church Street. Since 1960 the theatre has been maintained and operated by the Wieting Theatre Guild, a nonprofit organization of members and volunteers dedicated to keeping the doors of this grand old theatre open for many years to come. Movies play on most Friday, Saturday and Sunday evenings throughout the year. Actors, musicians, singers and dancers of all ages take the stage on numerous other occasions.

Healthcare
Toledo area residents have access to healthcare services at MercyCare or Unity Point Toledo. When hospitalization is required the closest and most convenient hospital for residents is Grinnell Regional Medical Center or Unity Point Hospital in Marshalltown.

References

External links

 
City website
Chamber of Commerce
South Tama County Community School District

 
Cities in Tama County, Iowa
Cities in Iowa
County seats in Iowa
Populated places established in 1853
1853 establishments in Iowa